Putative G-protein coupled receptor 42 is a protein that in humans is encoded by the GPR42P gene.

See also
 Free fatty acid receptor

References

Further reading

External links

G protein-coupled receptors